The 1907 Chicago Physicians and Surgeons football team represented the College of Physicians and Surgeons of Chicago during the 1907 college football season.

Schedule

It's possible that the contest against Shurtleff was referring to another Physicians and Surgeons college separate from Chicago's P&S team.

References

Chicago Physicians and Surgeons
Chicago Physicians and Surgeons football seasons
Chicago Physicians and Surgeons football